The 2000 Schleswig-Holstein state election was held on 27 February 2000 to elect the members of the Landtag of Schleswig-Holstein. The incumbent coalition government of the Social Democratic Party (SPD) and The Greens led by Minister-President Heide Simonis retained its majority and continued in office.

Parties
The table below lists parties represented in the previous Landtag of Schleswig-Holstein.

Opinion polling

Election result

|-
| colspan=8| 
|-
! colspan="2" | Party
! Votes
! %
! +/-
! Seats 
! +/-
! Seats %
|-
| bgcolor=| 
| align=left | Social Democratic Party (SPD)
| align=right| 630,827
| align=right| 43.1
| align=right| 3.3
| align=right| 41
| align=right| 8
| align=right| 46.1
|-
| bgcolor=| 
| align=left | Christian Democratic Union (CDU)
| align=right| 515,521
| align=right| 35.2
| align=right| 2.0
| align=right| 33
| align=right| 3
| align=right| 37.1
|-
| bgcolor=| 
| align=left | Free Democratic Party (FDP)
| align=right| 111,649
| align=right| 7.6
| align=right| 1.9
| align=right| 7
| align=right| 3
| align=right| 7.9
|-
| bgcolor=| 
| align=left | Alliance 90/The Greens (Grüne)
| align=right| 91,389
| align=right| 6.2
| align=right| 1.9
| align=right| 5
| align=right| 1
| align=right| 5.6
|-
| bgcolor=| 
| align=left | South Schleswig Voters' Association (SSW)
| align=right| 60,367
| align=right| 4.1
| align=right| 1.6
| align=right| 3
| align=right| 1
| align=right| 3.4
|-
! colspan=8|
|-
| bgcolor=| 
| align=left | Party of Democratic Socialism (PDS)
| align=right| 20,066
| align=right| 1.4
| align=right| 1.4
| align=right| 0
| align=right| ±0
| align=right| 0
|-
| bgcolor=| 
| align=left | National Democratic Party (NPD)
| align=right| 15,121
| align=right| 1.0
| align=right| 1.0
| align=right| 0
| align=right| ±0
| align=right| 0
|-
| bgcolor=|
| align=left | Others
| align=right| 19,355
| align=right| 1.3
| align=right| 
| align=right| 0
| align=right| ±0
| align=right| 0
|-
! align=right colspan=2| Total
! align=right| 1,464,096
! align=right| 100.0
! align=right| 
! align=right| 89
! align=right| 14
! align=right| 
|-
! align=right colspan=2| Voter turnout
! align=right| 
! align=right| 69.5
! align=right| 2.3
! align=right| 
! align=right| 
! align=right| 
|}

Sources
 The Federal Returning Officer

Elections in Schleswig-Holstein
Schleswig-Holstein
February 2000 events in Europe